Son's bent-toed gecko (Cyrtodactylus soni) is a species of lizard in the family Gekkonidae. The species is endemic to Vietnam.

Etymology
The specific name, soni, is in honor of Vietnamese herpetologist Son Lan Hung Nguyen.

Geographic range
C. soni is found in northern Vietnam, in Ninh Bình Province.

Habitat

Description

Reproduction
The mode of reproduction of C. soni is unknown.

References

Further reading
Le DT, Nguyen TQ, Le MD, Ziegler T (2016). "A new species of Cyrtodactylus (Squamata: Gekkonidae) from Ninh Binh Province, Vietnam". Zootaxa 4162 (2): 268–282. (Cyrtodactylus soni, new species).

Cyrtodactylus
Reptiles described in 2016